Madin Sahib 

(Madeen Sahab or Madin Saeb) is an old mosque located near Nowshohar, Srinagar, in Kashmir. The other neighborhoods close to it would be Bagh-e-Ali Mardan Khan and Saz Ghar Poor. 
Madin Sahib Masjid was built by Sultan Zain-ul-Abideen (Budshah) in 1448. He named it after his teacher Syed Mohammad Madani, who is also buried to the left of the Masjid. Syed Mohammad Madani became Madin Saeb for Kashmiris. 
Syed Madani came from Madeenah to India with Timur in 1398. He was sent to Kashmir as Timur's envoy to Sultan Sikander. Madin Sahib liked Kashmir so much that he decided to stay. He initially stayed in Rainawari after becoming a disciple of Syed Mohammad Hamadani. He later on moved close to Badshah's Capital Nowshahar, where Budshah built him the Khankhah. He died on 11 Rajab 849 (13 October 1445). Khwaja Baha-Ud-Din (Ganj-Bakhash) lead his funeral prayer. The tile work at Madin Saeb is considered one of the unique examples of this art and it is not seen anywhere else in Kashmir or Indian sub-continent for that matter.

Gallery

References

Mosques in Jammu and Kashmir
Srinagar